"Domino" is a song performed by Finnish singer songwriter Saara Aalto. It was released to digital retailers and streaming platforms on 16 February 2018 by Warner Music Finland. It was one of three songs competing in Uuden Musiikin Kilpailu 2018, the Finnish national selection for the Eurovision Song Contest 2018. It was later included on Aalto's major-label international debut studio album, Wild Wild Wonderland as its second single.

Eurovision Song Contest

In November 2017, at a press conference for Uuden Musiikin Kilpailu 2018, it was announced that Saara Aalto will represent Finland at the Eurovision Song Contest 2018 and her song will be selected through Uuden Musiikin Kilpailu 2018. The competition will feature three songs, all three competing entries will be performed by Aalto. The show took take place on 3 March 2018 at Espoo Metro Areena in Espoo, hosted by Krista Siegfrids and Mikko Silvennoinen. The winning song was determined by public voting and the votes from international jury panels. "Domino" finished second scoring 159 points.

Track listing

Charts

Release history

References

2018 songs
2018 singles
Saara Aalto songs
Warner Music Finland singles
English-language Finnish songs
Songs written by Bobby Ljunggren
Songs written by Thomas G:son